Prince released several hundred songs both under his own name and under pseudonyms and/or pen names, as well as writing songs which have been recorded by other artists. Estimates of the actual number of songs written by Prince (released and unreleased) range anywhere from 500 to well over 1,000. He has released 97 singles, 34 promotional singles, 21 internet singles, and eight internet downloads.

Overview 
After signing a contract with Warner Bros. Records in 1977 at age 18, he released his debut album For You the following year. Prince's first entry on the Billboard Hot 100 was "Soft and Wet" (1978), which peaked at number 92. The following year, he released "I Wanna Be Your Lover", which became a top-40 hit in several countries and peaked at number 11 in the United States; it topped the Billboard R&B chart in early 1980. The album Prince spawned a top-20 R&B hit single ("Why You Wanna Treat Me So Bad?") and a top-five dance hit ("Sexy Dancer"). His next two albums, Dirty Mind (1980) and Controversy (1981), furthered his success on the dance/R&B charts, spawning the top-five hits "Dirty Mind", "Uptown", "Head", "Controversy", and "Let's Work". In 1982, Prince released the album 1999, which spawned the Billboard Hot 100 hits "1999", "Little Red Corvette", and "Delirious" throughout 1983, during which time he earned distinction as one of the first black artists to be played on MTV alongside Michael Jackson. Purple Rain (1984) gave Prince two American number one singles ("When Doves Cry" and "Let's Go Crazy") while the three other singles, "Purple Rain", "I Would Die 4 U", and "Take Me with U" became worldwide top-10 hits and established him as one of the most popular performers of the decade.

Throughout 1985 and 1986, Prince scored the worldwide top-40 hits "Raspberry Beret", "Pop Life", "Paisley Park", "America", "Girls & Boys", "Mountains", and "Anotherloverholenyohead", as well as the number-one hit "Kiss", from the musically diverse albums Around the World in a Day and Parade. His 1987 double-album Sign o' the Times garnered a Grammy nomination for Album of the Year and spawned the top-20 hits "Sign o' the Times", "If I Was Your Girlfriend", "I Could Never Take the Place of Your Man" and "U Got the Look". His success in Europe and Asia increased throughout the late-1980s with his 1988 album Lovesexy which crafted the top-40 hits "Alphabet St.", "Glam Slam", and "I Wish U Heaven". Prince closed the 1980s recording the soundtrack to the massively successful 1989 film Batman, which included the worldwide number-one hit "Batdance" as well as the top 20 hits "Partyman", "Scandalous!", "The Future" and "The Arms of Orion". By the end of the decade, he had amassed the most entries on the Hot 100 of any act in the previous 10 years, including six worldwide number-one singles.

Prince entered the 1990s with the soundtrack to Graffiti Bridge; the album spawned the top-10 hit "Thieves in the Temple" and the top-40 hit "New Power Generation". His 1991 album Diamonds and Pearls spawned several hit singles including the title track, the number-one hit "Cream", "Insatiable", "Money Don't Matter 2 Night", "Gett Off", and "Thunder". The 1992 follow-up record, the Love Symbol Album, scored several top-40 hits including "Sexy MF", "My Name is Prince", "7", "Damn U", and "The Morning Papers". Prince's first compilation album, The Hits/The B-Sides (1993) included the top-40 hits "Pink Cashmere" and "Peach", while his 1994 album Come scored the hits "Letitgo" and "Space". That same year, he released a duet with Nona Gaye, "Love Sign" taken from his compilation album 1-800-NEW-FUNK.

In 1994, he released "The Most Beautiful Girl in the World", the second most successful hit of his career after "When Doves Cry" 10 years earlier; the single reached the top 10 of 20 countries worldwide. The song's album in question, The Gold Experience, was released the following year and hit the top 40 with the singles "I Hate U" (Prince's last original single to reach the United States top 40), "Gold", and "Endorphinmachine" (in Japan), while the promotional single "Purple Medley", a remix of his greatest hits, reached the top 20 worldwide. After scoring the UK Top 40 hit "Dinner with Delores" in 1996, Prince released the triple CD set Emancipation which spawned the top-20 hits "Betcha by Golly, Wow", "The Holy River", and "Somebody's Somebody" throughout 1996 and 1997. A re-release of the hit song "1999" in 1998 brought Prince back to the pop charts. "The Greatest Romance Ever Sold", released in late 1999, became a moderate worldwide success as Prince's single releases became less frequent.

Following the release of 2004's comeback record Musicology, the title track and "Call My Name" reached top 40 positions. In 2006, several compositions including "Black Sweat", "Fury", and "Te Amo Corazon" reached the top 20 of charts throughout Europe and Asia.

Prince has sold over 150 million records worldwide, including 48.9 million certified units in the United States, 4.7 million in France and over 5 million records in the United Kingdom, making him one of the best-selling artists of all time.

He has accumulated five US number-one singles and fifteen worldwide number 1 hits, as well as 8 worldwide number one albums. He was the most successful artist on the Billboard charts from 1980 to 2000, scoring 8 number 1 R&B singles and 7 number 1 Dance singles (tied for second place for male entertainers with Enrique Iglesias and Michael Jackson). He has scored over 50 top 40 hits around the world since 1979. He has been ranked as the 21st most successful sales act of all time, the 26th most successful chart artist worldwide, including 27 overall number-one entries, and being the most successful chart act of the 1980s, as well as the 10th most successful chart act of the 1990s. His most commercial period was from 1982's 1999 to 1996's Emancipation, however, he has maintained a loyal audience since and experienced a commercial resurgence with 2004's Musicology, paving the way for several successful albums to follow including his latest, Art Official Age, released in September 2014 reaching all major Top 40 markets. Prince has scored at least one top-40 hit every year from 1979 until 1999.

Singles

1970s–1980s

1990s

2000s

2010s–2020s

SV Single version differs from the album version.
RI "1999" and "Little Red Corvette" originally reached #25 and #54 respectively upon their 1983 UK release. Their peak (#2) was as part of a double A-side reissue in early 1985.

Promotional singles

Airplay-only songs
This section includes songs that were not released as commercial or promotional singles, but charted in the US due to airplay by radio stations.

Internet downloads
In this section all full songs are listed that have only been made available for download on the internet.

"Extraloveable Reloaded" and "Groovy Potential" were finally included on the album HITnRUN Phase Two (2015).
"The X's Face" was later included on the album HITnRUN Phase One (2015).

Streams
This section lists full songs that have only been made available to stream over the internet by Prince or a third-party affiliated to Prince, or to which Prince delivered a song for streaming purposes like music streaming services.

Other charted songs

Extended plays

A With The Revolution
B With The New Power Generation
C With 3rd Eye Girl

See also
 Prince albums discography
 Prince videography

Notes

References

External links
 

Discographies of American artists
Pop music discographies
Rhythm and blues discographies
Rock music discographies
Soul music discographies